Universal Soldier is the second compilation album from Scottish singer-songwriter Donovan. It was released in the UK (Marble Arch LP-MAL 718) in September 1967.

History
In the mid-1960s Pye Records launched budget record label Marble Arch Records to release older material on inexpensive albums in the United Kingdom.  Several of Donovan's 1965 recordings for Pye were selected for release in 1967 as Universal Soldier.  Donovan's version of "Universal Soldier" was a hit EP in 1965, and that name recognition was intended to boost sales.

Universal Soldier was a unique release because it collected the entire Universal Soldier EP, the b-side to "Catch the Wind", and the entire "Turquoise" single; all of which had not appeared before on LP format in the United Kingdom.  The strategy of compiling non-album tracks paid off, and Universal Soldier reached No. 5 in the United Kingdom and remained on the charts for 18 weeks.

Marble Arch would go on to release several more Donovan compilations to significantly less interest, including an edited What's Bin Did and What's Bin Hid in 1968 and an edited Fairytale in 1969.

In 1995, Spectrum Music released a CD compilation, also named after the title track.

Track listing
All tracks by Donovan Leitch, except where noted.

External links
 Universal Soldier – Donovan Unofficial Site

1967 compilation albums
Donovan compilation albums
Pye Records compilation albums
Albums produced by Geoff Stephens